Henderson is a former New Zealand parliamentary electorate, from 1969 to 1978 and then from 1993 to 1996.

Population centres
Henderson was first created through the 1967 electoral redistribution, which resulted from the Electoral Act 1965 that fixed the number of South Island electorates at 25. As a result, three additional electorates were created in the North Island, and one additional in the South Island. One of those new electorates was Henderson, which took over most of 's area. Localities that were covered by the electorate include Henderson, Oratia, Waiatarua, Parau, Huia, and Piha. In the 1972 electoral redistribution, there were slight boundary adjustments with the adjoining  and  electorates.

In 1996, the first mixed-member proportional (MMP) election, the area was absorbed into the new Waipareira electorate.

History
When Henderson was abolished for 1978 election, Finlay went into retirement.

Members of Parliament
Key

Election results

1993 election

1975 election

1972 election

1969 election

Notes

References

Historical electorates of New Zealand
Politics of the Auckland Region
1969 establishments in New Zealand
1993 establishments in New Zealand
1978 disestablishments in New Zealand
1996 disestablishments in New Zealand